Lupe Mejía, nicknamed "La Yaqui" or "La Cancionera Yaqui" ("The Yaqui Songstress"), is a Mexican singer and actress, known for her career as a performer of rancheras and other Mexican folk music genres.

Biography
Mejía was born in Ciudad Obregón, Sonora, Mexico. She began to sing at the age of 7 in school activities and among family members and friends. She began her career when she entered an amateur contest hosted by a television channel.

In Mexico City, she recorded her first single, "La flecha", with Peerless Records and its immediate success placed her among the most promising new Mexican singers. Her first album was titled La flecha and includes other songs such as "Cuando te hagan sufrir", "La fórmula", and "El pájaro desplumado". Her subsequent recordings for Peerless were also hits.

She also appeared in several Mexican films due to her success and popularity as a singer. She had acting roles in Condenados a muerte (1963) and El revólver sangriento (1964), where she worked with singers Antonio Aguilar and Juan Mendoza. 

She has also recorded singles and albums for the Orfeón, Musart, and GAS labels.

Discography

Studio albums
 La flecha 
 México alegre y bravío
 Chiquita pero picosa y otros éxitos
 Lupe Mejía "La Yaqui"
 ¡Ánimo!
 Se me acobarda el corazón
 Lupe Mejía "La Yaaki"

Compilation albums
 80 aniversario Peerless: 24 éxitos con mariachi y banda

References

External links
 

Mexican women singers
Mexican film actresses
Ranchera singers
Singers from Sonora
Actresses from Sonora
Mexican people of Yaqui descent
People from Ciudad Obregón
Possibly living people
Year of birth missing (living people)
Indigenous Mexican women